Noelia Beatriz Artigas Pizzo, commonly known as Noelia Artigas (born 4 June 1989) is a team handball goalkeeper from Uruguay. She plays on the Uruguay women's national handball team, and participated at the 2011 World Women's Handball Championship in Brazil.

Competitions
 2006: 2006 Beach Handball World Championships
 2008: 2008 Beach Handball World Championships
 2010: Juegos Suramericanos de 2010
 2011: Campeonato Panamericano de Balonmano Femenino de 2011
 2011: Juegos Panamericanos de 2011
 2012: 2012 Beach Handball World Championships
 2017: Campeonato Panamericano de Balonmano Femenino de 2017
 2018: Juegos Suramericanos de 2018

References

1989 births
Living people
Uruguayan female handball players
Place of birth missing (living people)
Handball players at the 2011 Pan American Games
Pan American Games competitors for Uruguay
21st-century Uruguayan women